Axonopus is a genus of plants in the grass family, known generally as carpet grass. They are native primarily to the tropical and subtropical regions of the Americas with one species in tropical Africa and another on Easter Island. They are sometimes rhizomatous and many are tolerant of periodic submersion.

 Species

 formerly included

See also
 List of Poaceae genera

References

External links
 Jepson Manual Treatment
 USDA Plants Profile
 Grass Manual Treatment
 Grassbase - The World Online Grass Flora
 Global Biodiversity Information Facility

Panicoideae
Poaceae genera
Grasses of North America
Grasses of South America
Grasses of Mexico
Taxa named by Palisot de Beauvois